Balaban is a village in the Nusaybin District of Mardin Province in Turkey. The village is populated by Kurds of the Mizizex tribe. It had a population of 347 in 2021. The village is both Muslim and Yazidi.

References 

Villages in Nusaybin District
Kurdish settlements in Mardin Province
Yazidi villages in Turkey